Baie Larose, or Larose Bay in English, is a bay of Grande Terre, the main island of the subantarctic Kerguelen archipelago, a French territory in the southern Indian Ocean.  It is important as a breeding site for seabirds, especially penguins.

Description
The bay lies on the southern coast of Grande Terre, west of Mont Ross and Gallieni Massif, and encompassing the mouth of Fjord Larose and the tilted monolith known as the Doigt de Sainte Anne (Saint Anne's Finger).

Important Bird Area
The bay, with part of the south-western slopes of Mont Ross, has been identified as a 20 km2 Important Bird Area (IBA) by BirdLife International because of its breeding seabirds.  Of the penguins, there are some 21,500 pairs of kings, 500 pairs of gentoos, 6000 pairs of macaronis and 4000 pairs of eastern rockhoppers.  Other birds nesting in the IBA include a few pairs of wandering albatrosses, Antarctic and slender-billed prions, white-chinned, northern giant and common diving petrels, Kerguelen shags, Kerguelen terns, black-faced sheathbills and Eaton's pintails.  Antarctic fur seals and southern elephant seals also breed on the shores of the bay.

References

Landforms of the Kerguelen Islands
Important Bird Areas of Kerguelen
Larose